Zamin-e Hansin (also Romanized as Zamīn-e Ḩanşīn, Zamīn Ḩanşīn, and Zamīn Ḩansīn; also known as Zamīn-e Ḩoseyn) is a village in Gafr and Parmon Rural District, Gafr and Parmon District, Bashagard County, Hormozgan Province, Iran. At the 2006 census, its population was 22, in 6 families.

References 

Populated places in Bashagard County